Dundee Ward Road railway station served the city of Dundee, Scotland from 1832 to 1861 on the Dundee and Newtyle Railway.

History 
The station opened as Dundee West Ward on 3 April 1832 by the Dundee and Newtyle Railway. Its name was changed to Dundee Ward Road in 1853. The station closed to both passengers and goods traffic on 10 June 1861.

References

External links 

Disused railway stations in Dundee
Railway stations in Great Britain opened in 1831
Railway stations in Great Britain closed in 1861
1831 establishments in Scotland
1861 disestablishments in Scotland